Torrey Hills is a community of  located in northern San Diego, California, United States.  Torrey Hills is a part of District 1 which is represented by Councilmember Joe LaCava on the San Diego City Council.

Geography
Torrey Hills is bordered to the north by State Route 56 and Carmel Valley, to the northeast by Carmel Valley, to the south and southeast by Los Peñasquitos Canyon and Mira Mesa, and to the west by Interstate 5.

History
Before European contact, Torrey Hills was part of a prehistoric trade route between the Kumeyaay trade village of Ystagua in Sorrento Valley and Ahwel-Awa in San Dieguito on the way to the Payómkawichum tribe in the north, which was adopted to become part of the El Camino Real under the Spanish.

In 1979 when Carmel Valley was being planned, the city had conducted studies on the Los Peñasquitos Canyon Preserve as an open space park, but had not determined the boundary of the park.  The city then designated Sorrento Hills (now Torrey Hills) as Future Urbanizing on the General Plan.

This created a border for the preserve. As a result, a community planning program was initiated, and the original plan area was transferred from Future Urbanizing to Planned Urbanizing on the General Plan, excluding  adjacent to the Sorrento Hills community planning area, which was designated as Future Urbanizing.

Between the  parcel and Interstate 5,  additional were incorporated into the ballot measure, which in total provided an additional  to Sorrento Hills. The ballot resulted in the city designating Sorrento Hills as Planned Urbanizing.

As of 2010, the land in Torrey Hills is almost completely built-out.  Some of the home sub-divisions are Montecito, Sea Country, The Shores, Sausalito, and Vantage Point.  The rest of the area is bordered by office buildings, hotels, and large, dense apartment complexes.

In September 2001, the Sorrento Hills Community Planning Board voted to change the name of the community to Torrey Hills. In early 2002, the San Diego City Council initiated a plan amendment to formally change the community name.  Despite this, the then superintendent of Del Mar Union School District insisted that the new elementary school, being built down the street from Torrey Hills Park, be called Sorrento Hills Elementary, despite the strong objections from parents in the neighborhood.  Residents no longer referred to the area as Sorrento Hills since nearby Sorrento Valley is filled with office parks, self-storage businesses, and a pet cemetery from the 1950s.  
The name of the school was eventually changed to Torrey Hills Elementary upon completion in 2002-03.

Education
One of the schools in the community is Torrey Hills Elementary School, a high-achieving elementary school, one of eight schools in the Del Mar Union School District. It offers a curriculum that includes music, art, technology, and a science lab. The school includes kindergarten through 6th grade, and has an active after school program organized by the Del Mar Union School District. The Torrey Hills colors are black and red, and their mascot is the Hawk. The principal is Abby Domingo.

Those who live north of Carmel Mountain Road and east of El Camino Real may have to option to attend Ocean Air Elementary School.

Students from Torrey Hills Elementary usually attend Carmel Valley Middle School in Carmel Valley or Earl Warren in Solana Beach. After middle school, most students attend Torrey Pines High School or Canyon Crest Academy (the latter referred to as "CCA", both being public schools). Canyon Crest Academy is ranked academically as the 5th best high school in the state of California, while Torrey Pines High School is ranked at 30th (out of 1,598 public high schools).

Notes

External links 
 The City of San Diego: Torrey Hills Community Profile

Neighborhoods in San Diego